The Badminton Theater is a venue utilized for the staging of medium- and large-scale multiplex events. Situated inside the metropolitan park of Goudi in Athens, Greece, the theater was originally designed to host concerts, plays, dance performances and musicals. As of 2012, conferences, meetings, presentations and corporate events are also held at the venue due to the construction of additional facilities.

History and architectural transformation

The venue was initially built and used for the sport of Badminton during the 2004 Olympic Games, opening immediately before the games. As the venue became further established, the facility was made available for leasing, with the management utilizing a public tender process, and "Athens Badminton Cultural Development S.A." (ABCD) outbid. ABCD acquired the premises for a 20-year timeframe, and subsequently embarked on radical reform and development of the property.

The building was eventually converted into a versatile facility, suitable for medium- and large-scale events. The remodeling work began in the summer of 2006 and was completed in 2007, with investment exceeding 16 million euros.

The post-industrial style of the exterior and the venue's large open spaces were the only things that remained intact. The interior was entirely rebuilt to create a modern auditorium, capable of seating 2,430 people, surrounded by foyers and halls.

The Badminton Theater has been used in several major international theater, dance and television productions and conferences.

The Theater

The main areas of Badminton Theater are:

The Auditorium

The Badminton Theater  Auditorium is the largest of its kind in Greece. The stage is 30-meter wide, with a depth of 18 meters, while the ceiling height is 15.5 meters, and is equipped with a programming console (Vatalpha Type) that is capable of changing the scenery appearance in a matter of seconds. For conferences and corporate events, the stage accommodates panels of speakers and presentations, with a central podium also available to guests. The image viewer can also be used to convert the scene into a viewing area. High quality projectors are employed for the lighting of the area; lighting equipment includes 200-inch dimmers, a "Congo ETC" lighting console, and five LED panels for displays and the projection of subtitles.

The ergonomic design of the theater provides unobstructed visibility and, for events that require a greater immediacy for a smaller audience, a mobile partition can be employed.

The acoustics of the venue are capable of an average reverberation time of less than 1.1 seconds audio in the room is evenly distributed to within ± 2 decibels (db) from point-to-point and the central console is a digital 96-channel "MIDAS XL 8". The acoustic design of the theater was completed by Theodore Timagenis, an acoustic design consultancy firm founded in 1975.

The Foyer

The foyer consists of two multi-use areas that collectively occupy more than 1,500 square meters (sq. m.) of space.

The Upper Foyer, the main reception area for visitors, consists of banners with an internal lighting mechanism and flat screens for the viewing of video material. The Upper Foyer also overlooks Army Park and is illuminated by natural lighting. This main reception area is connected to the lower level by two open stairwells and an elevator. The Lower Foyer connects with the lower tier of the amphitheater and consists of allocated smoking rooms.

The Hallway
The Hallway is the main reception area for visitors.
The most common uses for the receipt of tickets, registering participants and screened. In this area there are 8 service counters, hung flat screen TFT panels and illuminated system (banners), buffer flow control for the increased attendance and lift for the disabled. In March 2012, Badminton Theater implemented an electronic barcode check-in system.

Additional Support Infrastructure
Apart from the aforementioned areas, Badminton Theater features additional infrastructure, serving the diverse needs of individual events, including:
 Administration offices
 Backstage Space
 Dressing Rooms
 Rehearsal Room
 Technical Amphitheater
 Green Room
 Meeting Hall (maximum capacity: 300 people)
 Press Room (70 people)
 Large storage areas

Access
The Badminton Theater is located inside the area of the metropolitan park of Goudi, at the junction of Mesogeion and Katechaki/Kanelopoulou Avenues (Goudi area), with easy access from "Katehaki" Metro station (Line 3) and bus lines.

The outdoor space around the complex can host more than 800 vehicles, or more than 70 buses, through the entrances from Mesogeion Avenue (Former Police Academy) and Katechaki/Kanellopoulou Avenue.

Events

2007
Matthew Bourne's Swan Lake: 31 January – 11 February 2007
Dean Perry's Tap Dogs: 20 – 25 March 2007
Jesus Christ Superstar: 18 April – 14 May 2007
Tiger Lillies: 1 – 10 June 2007
Lord of the Dance: 18 – 28 June 2007
Cristina Hoyos - Viaje al Sur: 26 – 28 September 2007
BoccaTango: 4 – 8 October 2007
Caetano Veloso: 25 October 2007
Pilobolus: 29 October – 2 November 2007
Beauty and the Beast: 7 – 25 November 2007
MOMIX: 1 – 7 December 2007
Woody Allen and his New Orleans Jazz Band: 28 – 29 December 2007

2008
Budapest Gypsy Symphony Orchestra: 4 – 6 January 2008
FUEGO!: 23 – 27 January 2008
TABLÒ: 6 – 17 February 2008
Michael Nyman: 4 March 2008
Mamma Mia!: 6 May – 15 June 2008
Polly Jean Harvey: 30 June 2008
West Side Story 50th Anniversary World Tour: 10 – 29 September 2008
Roger Hodgson - The Voice of Supertramp: 11 October 2008
Tango Fire: 15 – 20 October 2008
Kitaro - Love and Peace: 23 October 2008
Carmen: 30 October – 2 November 2008
Le Quatuor!: 12 – 16 November 2008
National Theatre Prague Ballet's Solo for Three: 19-23 November 2008
National Theatre Prague Ballet's Romeo and Juliet: 26-30 November 2008
Cirque Éloize - Rain: 4 – 21 December 2008

2009
Tiger Lillies Freakshow: 13 – 23 January 2009
Edward Scissorhands (dance): 27 January – 8 February 2009
Budapest Gypsy Symphony Orchestra: 13 – 18 February 2009
Tindersticks: 21 February 2009
Max Raabe & Palast Orchester: 24 March 2009
Don Quichotte: 3 – 12 April 2009
Nuevo Ballet Español: 5 – 10 May 2009
Rhythm Of The Dance: 22 – 31 May 2009
Tango Pasiοn: 9 – 14 June 2009
Bertolt Brecht's Kurt Weill: 18 – 20 June 2009
Antony & The Johnsons: 29 June 2009
David Byrne: 6 July 2009
Grupo Compay Segundo: 16 July 2009
Archive: 11 September 2009
Spaghetti Western Orchestra: 16–25 September 2009
Kevin Costner & Modern West: 14 October 2009
Singin' in the Rain: 21–25 October 2009
Universal Ballet - Nutcracker: 24 November – 13 December 2009
Chicago Mass Choir: 15 December 2009

2010
Las Vegas Magic Festival: 5 – 17 January 2010
Patricia Kaas: 6 February 2010
St. Petersburg State Ice Ballet - The Sleeping Beauty: 3–21 March 2010
Béjart Ballet - Lausanne: 27 – 28 March 2010
Matthew Bourne's Swan Lake: 14 – 25 April 2010
Evita: 11 – 30 May 2010
Shen Yun Performing Arts: 3 – 4 June 2010
Ana Moura: 14 – 20 June 2010
Thriller – LIVE: 9 – 21 June 2010
Barbara Mendes: 21 – 26 June 2010
Nnena Freelon: 28 June – 3 July 2010
Maria & Alba Serrano: 14 – 17 July 2010
The Cherrt Orchard:1 – 3 October 2010
Rasta Thomas - Rock The Ballet: 10 – 13 November 2010
STOMP: 30 November – 5 December 2010

2011
Eva Yerbabuena's Ballet Flamenco: 15 – 16 January 2011
Bolero Chopiniana: 4 – 6 February 2011
2nd International Magic Festival: 9 – 20 February 2011
Béjart Ballet - Lausanne's Ballet for Life: 25 – 28 February 2011
Alice in Wonderland: 18 – 20 March 2011
Forever Tango: 29 March – 3 April 2011
Patito Feo: April 2011
Ottmar Liebert & Luna Negra: 4 April 2011
Los maestros del Tango: 13 – 14 May 2011
Laurie Anderson's Delusion: 8 June 2011
Shaolin Legend: 24 September 2011
Spartacus: 19 – 21 October 2011
The Cossacks of Russia: 28 – 30 October 2011
Voca People: 4 – 6 November 2011
Georgian National Ballet: 13 November 2011
La Traviata: 17 – 18 November 2011
Tango Por Dos: 19 – 20 November 2011
Cinderella on Ice: 2 – 4 December 2011
Don Quichotte: 9 – 11 December 2011
Afrikania: 16 – 18 December 2011
Nutcracker: 25 – 29 December 2011
Dora the Explorer: 31 December 2011- 29 January 2012
West End Stars in Concert: 20 – 23 December 2011

2012
Harlem Swing's Ain't Misbehavin''': 17 – 22 January 2012Bollywood Show: 23 January 2012
3rd World Magic Festival: 8 – 12 February 2012ΑΒΒΑmania: 17 – 18 February 2012
Searching for Attik
Tin City (By Eugenia Fakinou): 3, 4, 10, 11, 17, 18, 24, 25 & 31 March &  1 April 2012
Manolis Rasoulis - Crack in time: 19 March 2012
1821 - Songs of the Revolutionary Greeks: 26 March 2012
Actors singing Mikis Theodorakis: 27 March 2012
A Tribute to Eptanisian Music: 2 April 2012
Michael Soyoul - From the keys of Bandoneón to the strings of Bouzouki: 14 May 2012
"Angela Papazoglou" with Anna Vagena: 20 May 2012
Béjart Ballet Lausanne / BOLERO - DIONYSOS - SYNCOPE: 6–10 June 2012
Euripides - Iphigenia at Aulis: Summer 2012
Fuerza Bruta Look Up!: September 2012
Sleeping Beauty - GRIGOROVICH BALLET THEATRE: 11–16 October 2012
Ballet Flamenco de Andalucía: 3–4 November 2012
At the Markets of Manos Hatzidakis: 9 November 2012
Kostas Virvos - I do not live kneeling": 12 November 2012La Traviata - Stanislavsky Theatre: 22–24 November 2012
Gustavo Russo - Tango Seduccion!: 28 November 2012
The Wiener Johann Strauss Capelle: 1–2 December 2012
Iakovos Kambanelis - Mauthausen: 6–9 December 2012
Flying Superkids: 14–16 December 2012
Splendid - China National Acrobatic Troupe: December 2012Mauthausen'', a theatrical play based on the "Mauthausen Trilogy", premiered  6 December 2012

References

External links

Official Page
Olympic Properties Web Page
The City of Athens Official Visitors' Website

Venues of the 2004 Summer Olympics
Olympic badminton venues
Indoor arenas in Greece
Sports venues in Greece
Theatres in Athens